Wara-Wara Bafodia is a chiefdom in Koinadugu District of Sierra Leone with a population of 25,713. Its principal/capital town is Bafodia.

References

Chiefdoms of Sierra Leone
Northern Province, Sierra Leone